Basquiat is a 1996 American biographical drama film directed, co-written and co-composed by Julian Schnabel in his feature directorial debut. The film is based on the life of American postmodernist/neo expressionist artist Jean-Michel Basquiat. It is the first film about an American painter written and directed by another artist.

Jeffrey Wright portrays Basquiat, a Brooklyn-born artist who used his graffiti roots as a foundation to create collage-style paintings on canvas. David Bowie plays Basquiat's friend and mentor, pop artist Andy Warhol. Additional cast members include Gary Oldman as a thinly disguised Schnabel, Michael Wincott as the poet and art critic Rene Ricard, Dennis Hopper as Bruno Bischofberger, Parker Posey as gallery owner Mary Boone, Christopher Walken as a devious, intrusive journalist, Willem Dafoe as a supportive artist who’s making ends meet as an electrician, and Claire Forlani, Courtney Love, Tatum O'Neal, and Benicio del Toro in supporting roles as "composite characters".

Plot 

The film is a lightly fictionalized account of Basquiat's life. A struggling artist living in a cardboard box in Tompkins Square Park works his way up the rungs of the New York art world in the eighties, thanks in part to his association with Andy Warhol, the art dealer Bruno Bischofberger, poet and critic René Ricard, and fellow artist Albert Milo.

Alongside the development of his artistic career, the film follows Basquiat's tumultuous relationship with Gina, a fellow aspiring artist he meets while she is working as a waitress at the diner he frequents with his friend Benny. Their romance is affected by Basquiat's affair with "Big Pink", a woman he picks up on the street, and his habitual abuse of heroin. Eventually, Basquiat finds himself isolated by his fame, the death of Warhol, and his drug use. The film ends with an intertitle stating that Basquiat died of a heroin overdose on August 12, 1988, at the age of 27.

Cast

 Jeffrey Wright as Jean-Michel Basquiat
 David Bowie as Andy Warhol
 Benicio del Toro as Benny Dalmau
 Dennis Hopper as Bruno Bischofberger
 Gary Oldman as Albert Milo
 Michael Wincott as René Ricard
 Claire Forlani as Gina Cardinale
 Parker Posey as Mary Boone
 Courtney Love as Big Pink
 Elina Löwensohn as Annina Nosei
 Paul Bartel as Henry Geldzahler
 Tatum O'Neal as Cynthia Kruger
 Christopher Walken as The Interviewer
 Willem Dafoe as the Electrician
 Sam Rockwell as Thug
 Linda Larkin as Fan

Production

Writing
Julian Schnabel had given seed money to another film that was being developed about Jean-Michel Basquiat, but when he read an early script that he believed misrepresented Andy Warhol, he decided to make the film himself. Schnabel said, ''In the film, I wanted to make a requiem for Jean and Andy ... They were so attacked. Andy cared about Jean-Michel. He was really human. He wasn't a vampire. His death broke Jean-Michel's heart."

The film has a screenplay by Schnabel and a story by John Bowe, Michael Holman—a former member of theatrical rock group The Tubes, who had met Basquiat in 1979 and together founded an experimental, industrial/electronica group called Gray.—and Lech Majewski.

Schnabel's art in film
As director, Schnabel inserted himself into the film as the fictional character Albert Milo (Gary Oldman), based on himself. Schnabel also added cameo appearances by his mother, father, and daughter (as Milo's family). Schnabel appeared as an extra as a waiter.

Basquiat was the first commercial feature film about a painter made by a painter. Schnabel said:
"I know what it's like to be attacked as an artist. I know what it's like to be judged as an artist. I know what it's like to arrive as an artist and have fame and notoriety. I know what it's like to be accused of things that you never said or did. I know what it's like to be described as a piece of hype. I know what it's like to be appreciated as well as degraded."

Basquiat died in 1988 of mixed-drug toxicity (he had been combining cocaine and heroin, known as "speedballing"). Basquiat's estate denied permission for his work to be used in the film. Schnabel and his studio assistant Greg Bogin created paintings "in the style of" Basquiat for the film.

Casting
After the film was released, Jeffrey Wright said that "I think my performance was appropriated, literally, and the way I was edited was appropriated in the same way his [Basquiat's] story has been appropriated and that he was appropriated when he was alive. [...] Julian made him out to be too docile and too much of a victim and too passive and not as dangerous as he really was. It's about containing Basquiat. It's about aggrandizing himself through Basquiat's memory."

Comparing Bowie's Warhol to earlier portrayals, Paul Morrissey (who directed many Warhol films) said "Bowie was the best by far. You come away from Basquiat thinking Andy was comical and amusing, not a pretentious, phony piece of shit, which is how others show him." He also noted that "Bowie at least knew Andy. They went to the same parties." Bowie was able to borrow Warhol's actual wig, glasses and jacket from the Warhol Museum in Pittsburgh for the film. Writer Bob Colacello, who edited Warhol's Interview magazine in the 70's and early 80's, said "[Crispin] Glover walked the most like [the real] Andy, [Jared] Harris talked the most like Andy, and Bowie looked the most like Andy. When I first saw Bowie on the set, it was like Andy had been resurrected."

In 2018, musician and actor Lenny Kravitz said in an interview with V Magazine, that director Julian Schnabel had asked him to take the role of Basquiat. Kravitz said, "I look back and I'm like, wow, I probably should have done that".

Release

Box office
Basquiat opened theatrically on August 9, 1996 in 6 venues, earning $83,863 in its first weekend. The film ultimately grossed $3,011,195 domestically.

Critical reception

The film received positive reviews from critics. On review aggregator website Rotten Tomatoes, the film has a 67% rating based on 30 reviews, with an average rating of 6.9/10. Metacritic reports a 65 out of 100 rating based on 20 critics, indicating "generally favorable reviews".

Roger Ebert of the Chicago Sun-Times awarded the film three and a half out of a possible four stars stating that in Schnabel's portrayal Basquiat "is a quiet, almost wordless presence, a young man who rarely says what he is thinking and often deliberately chooses to miss the point of a conversation. He is dreamy, sweet, and pensive. There are deep hurts and angers". Similarly, Janet Maslin in The New York Times called the film "bold, attention-getting and more than a little facile, a stylish-looking film without the connective tissue to give it real depth."

David Bonetti gave the film a poor review due to his perception of the inexperience of the director stating "Schnabel can't decide whether he wants to tell a traditional rise-and-fall morality tale or make an art film. His attempt at telling Basquiat's story straightforwardly collapses under its own banality". Similarly, the Los Angeles Examiner said that "Basquiat does not seem interested in anything that doesn't advance its director's personal agenda." The review stated that "Though as a writer-director, Schnabel's work is not the total fiasco the debut films of fellow artists David Salle (Search and Destroy) and Robert Longo (Johnny Mnemonic) were, it is fascinating to see what a compendium of Troubled Genius movie cliches he has turned out." Like several of the negative reviews, the review picked out for praise the acting of Jeffrey Wright as Jean-Michel Basquiat, saying "Basquiat's only genuine inspiration was casting Jeffrey Wright, who won a Tony for his work in Angels in America on the New York stage, as the artist. An actor whose talent is visible even in this standard role, Wright's ability creates more interest in Basquiat's fate than would otherwise exist."

The reviews in the art press focused more on the relation of Schnabel as director to his portrayal of Schnabel as artist in the film, and on changes to the facts of Basquiat's life introduced by Schnabel to make a more accessible film. In Art in America, the art critic Brooks Adams wrote:
Basquiat can be seen as a huge, lurking self-portrait of the artist-Schnabel, not Basquiat. So laden is the film with the innumerable coincidences of Basquiat and Schnabel's enthusiasms (among others, for pajamas and surfing) that the movie should be more appropriately called My Basquiat... To a remarkable degree, the movie succeeds, by dint of its authorial slant, in popularizing the myth of Basquiat as a young, gorgeous, doomed, yet ultimately transcendent black male artist, even as it extends and reinflates the myth of Schnabel as a protean, Picassoid white male painter... Yet for all one's apprehension about the very idea of Schnabel making such a film, Basquiat turns out to be a surprisingly good movie...It is also an art work.

Music
The following songs are in order of their appearance in the film.

 "Fairytale of New York" – The Pogues
 "Public Image" – Public Image Ltd.
 "Girlfriend" – The Modern Lovers
 "Suicide Mode" – Nicholas Marion Taylor
 "Suicide Hotline Mode" – Nicholas Marion Taylor
 "I'm Not in Love" – Toadies
 "Lust for Life" – Iggy Pop
 "The Nearness of You" – Keith Richards
 "Waiting on a Friend" – The Rolling Stones
 "Pixote Theme" – Electro Band
 "It's All Over Now, Baby Blue" – Them
 "You Can't Be Funky (If You Haven't Got Soul)" – Bush Tetras
 "Flamenco Sketches" – Miles Davis
 "Ko-Ko" – Charlie Parker
 "White Lines" – Melle Mel (as GrandMaster Flash Melle Mel)
 "Beast of Burden" – The Rolling Stones
 "Rise" – Tripping Daisy
 "Is That All There Is?" – Peggy Lee
 "Paris Je T'aime (Paris, Stay the Same)" – David McDermott
 "April in Paris" – Charlie Parker
 "Who Are You This Time" – Tom Waits
 "India" – The Psychedelic Furs
 "D'amor sull'ali rosee" (Il trovatore, Act 4 Sc. 1) – Renata Tebaldi
 "Tom Traubert's Blues (Four Sheets to the Wind in Copenhagen)" – Tom Waits
 "A Small Plot of Land" – David Bowie
 Symphony No. 3, Opus 36 (Symphony of Sorrowful Songs) – Henryk Górecki (London Sinfonietta)
 "Summer in Siam" – The Pogues
 "She Is Dancing" – Brian Kelly
 "Hallelujah" – John Cale
 "This Is the Last Song I'll Ever Sing" – Gavin Friday

See also
 Postmodernist film
 Downtown 81
I Shot Andy Warhol - another Warhol-related film from the same year

References

External links
 
 
 
 
 Official trailer

1996 films
1990s Spanish-language films
1996 directorial debut films
1996 drama films
1996 independent films
1996 LGBT-related films
1990s biographical drama films
1990s English-language films
American films based on actual events
American biographical drama films
American independent films
American LGBT-related films
Biographical films about painters
Cultural depictions of 20th-century painters
Cultural depictions of Andy Warhol
Films about interracial romance
Films directed by Julian Schnabel
Films produced by Jon Kilik
Films scored by John Cale
Films set in Manhattan
Films set in the 1980s
Films shot in New York City
Jean-Michel Basquiat
LGBT-related drama films
LGBT-related films based on actual events
Miramax films
1990s American films